Hélène Barcelo (born 1954) is a mathematician from Québec specializing in algebraic combinatorics. Within that field, her interests include combinatorial representation theory, homotopy theory, and arrangements of hyperplanes.
She is a professor emeritus of mathematics at Arizona State University, and deputy director of the Mathematical Sciences Research Institute (MSRI). She was editor-in-chief of the Journal of Combinatorial Theory, Series A, from 2001 to 2009.

Education and career
Barcelo completed her Ph.D. from the University of California, San Diego in 1988. Her dissertation, On the Action of the Symmetric Group on the Free Lie Algebra and on the Homology and Cohomology of the Partition Lattice, was supervised by Adriano Garsia.

She joined the Arizona State faculty after postdoctoral studies at the University of Michigan. She retired from Arizona State, becoming a professor emerita there, and became deputy director at MSRI in 2008.

Recognition
She was elected to the 2018 class of fellows of the American Mathematical Society,
to the 2019 class of fellows of the Association for Women in Mathematics,
and to the 2021 class of Fellows of the American Association for the Advancement of Science.

References

External links
Home page

1954 births
Living people
20th-century American mathematicians
21st-century American mathematicians
20th-century Canadian mathematicians
21st-century Canadian mathematicians
Canadian women mathematicians
American women mathematicians
Arizona State University faculty
Fellows of the American Mathematical Society
Fellows of the Association for Women in Mathematics
Fellows of the American Association for the Advancement of Science
Canadian expatriate academics in the United States
University of Michigan people
20th-century women mathematicians
21st-century women mathematicians
Academic journal editors
20th-century American women
21st-century American women
20th-century Canadian women scientists